Bolivaroscelis bolivarii is a species of praying mantis in the family Amorphoscelidae.  It is found in Cameroon.

See also
List of mantis genera and species

References

Bolivaroscelis
Insects described in 1913
Insects of Cameroon